Yevhen Viktorovych Levchenko, also known as Evgeniy Levchenko (born 2 January 1978 in Kostiantynivka, Ukrainian SSR, Soviet Union) is a retired Ukrainian-Dutch footballer. The main participant of the Russian version of the show The Bachelor-Kholostyak on Russian Televisional Channel TNT.

Club career
Yevhen started out his football career in 1993 at local club Metalurh Kostiantynivka. The following year he was transferred to Shakhtar Donetsk, one of the best football clubs in Ukraine. Two seasons later, in 1996, Levchenko moved to a Russian club CSKA Moskva, from where he progressed to Vitesse Arnhem, and finally Helmond Sport. In 1998, Yevhen joined Cambuur Leeuwarden, where he played for two years. He played for Vitesse Arnhem again from the year 2000 until 2003, when he switched to Sparta Rotterdam.

In 2005, Levchenko was transferred to another Dutch club, FC Groningen. He left FC Groningen at the end of the 2008–09 season on a free transfer, on 30 July 2009 FC Saturn Moscow Oblast signed the Ukrainian national player, he comes on a free transfer from FC Groningen of the Netherlands and signed a contract for 1.5 years. In 2010, Levchenko signed with Willem II on a free transfer. In 2011, Levchenko signed with A-League club Adelaide United on a 1-year deal. He scored his first goal for the club during an Asian Champions League playoff against Persipura Jayapura of Indonesia on 16 February 2012. On 25 March 2012, it was announced the club and player had mutually agreed to the termination of his contract.

On 30 Januari 2014 he announced his retirement from professional football in order to pursue a degree in Marketing. On 1 July 2019 he became the president of the Dutch trade union for professional footballers

International career
In 2001 Levchenko has been called up to Ukraine national team, he was announced as a part of the squad for 2002 World Cup qualification. He made his debut for Ukraine in a qualification game against Norway and has been capped a total of 8 times.

Personal life
In 2001 he became a naturalized Dutch citizen.

See also
Sparta Rotterdam season 2003–04

Bibliography
Koppe, Iris Lev, publishing house De Bezige Bij, (Dutch language), October 2015,

References

External links

Yevhen Levchenko's official web site

Yevhen Levchenko: career, fotos, goals, games
fcgstats.nl
Adelaide United profile

1978 births
Living people
Ukrainian footballers
Ukraine international footballers
FC Shakhtar Donetsk players
Adelaide United FC players
SBV Vitesse players
Helmond Sport players
SC Cambuur players
Sparta Rotterdam players
FC Groningen players
FC Saturn Ramenskoye players
Willem II (football club) players
Eerste Divisie players
Eredivisie players
Russian Premier League players
A-League Men players
Ukrainian expatriate footballers
Expatriate footballers in the Netherlands
Expatriate footballers in Russia
Expatriate soccer players in Australia
Ukrainian expatriate sportspeople in the Netherlands
Ukrainian expatriate sportspeople in Russia
Ukrainian expatriate sportspeople in Australia
PFC CSKA Moscow players
Association football midfielders